Australia at the 1998 Commonwealth Games was abbreviated AUS. This was their sixteenth of 16 Commonwealth Games having participated in all Games meets up to these Games. The games took place in Kuala Lumpur, between the 11th - 21 September. Australia placed first, winning a total of 198, with 311 competitors.

Medals

| style="text-align:left; width:78%; vertical-align:top;"|

| width="22%" align="left" valign="top" |

Sport Debuts
The 1998 commonwealth games was the first games that tea sports were played. Australia debuted teams in cricket, rugby sevens, hockey, and netball.

The 1998 games have been the only games which cricket has been played. Australia won a silver medal, losing gold to South Africa.
Australia won a bronze medal in Rugby Sevens, defeating Samoa in the playoff. The gold and silver medals were lost to New Zealand and Fiji respectively. 
The Australian men's hockey team won gold, defeating Malaysia in the finals and the women's team won gold, defeating England in the finals. 
Australia won gold in the netball final against New Zealand, this was one of the first major netball tournaments that Australia took part in.

Results by event

Athletics
Men
Track and Road Events

Field Events

Combined Events - Decathlon

Women
Track and Road Events

Field Events

Combined Events - Heptathlon

Badminton

Boxing

Cricket
The 1998 Commonwealth Games was the first and only games that cricket has been included in. Matches were 50 overs a side. Australia came second , losing the gold medal to South Africa by 4 wickets. 
Australia placed first in pool B, against Antigua and Barbuda, India and Canada.

Players
 Steve Waugh 
 Mark Waugh 
 Michael Bevan
 Glenn McGrath 
 Andy Bichel 
 Damien Fleming
 Adam Gilchrist 
 Brendon Julian
 Michael Kasprowicz
 Darren Lehmann
 Damien Martyn
 Tom Moody
 Ricky Ponting
 Gavin Robertson
 Brad Young
Coach: Geoff Marsh
Manager: Steve Bernard
Physiotherapist: Errol Alcott

Steve Waugh scored the third most runs in the tournament with 215 and Damien Fleming and Brad Young took the 1st and 3rd spots for the most wickets, 14 and 10 respectively.

Cycling
Road
Men

Women

Diving
Men

Women

Gymnastics
Men

Women

Lawn Bowls

Netball
This was the first year that netball was played at the Commonwealth Games. Australia won the gold medal in the final against New Zealand.
Australia was in group A along with Barbados, Canada, England, Jamaica and Malaysia. Group B was Cook Islands, Malawi, New Zealand, South Africa, Sri Lanka and Wales.

Rhythmic Gymnastics

Rugby Sevens

Shooting

Squash

Swimming
Men

Women

Synchronised Swimming

See also 
 Australia at the 1996 Summer Olympics
 Australia at the 2000 Summer Olympics

References

External links
Commonwealth Games Australia Results Database

1998
Nations at the 1998 Commonwealth Games
Commonwealth Games